The 2003 Nigerian Senate election in Jigawa State was held on April 12, 2003, to elect members of the Nigerian Senate to represent Jigawa State. Bello Maitama Yusuf representing Jigawa South-West, Ibrahim Muhammed Kirikasama representing Jigawa North-East and Dalha Ahmed Dan-Zalo representing Jigawa North-West all won on the platform of the All Nigeria Peoples Party.

Overview

Summary

Results

Jigawa South-West 
The election was won by Bello Maitama Yusuf of the All Nigeria Peoples Party.

Jigawa North-East 
The election was won by Ibrahim Muhammed Kirikasama of the All Nigeria Peoples Party.

Jigawa North-West 
The election was won by Dalha Ahmed Dan-Zalo of the All Nigeria Peoples Party.

References 

April 2003 events in Nigeria
Jigawa State Senate elections
Jig